Charlie Hammonds Seaplane Base  was a public-use seaplane base located at 1200 Dunn Street in Houma, a city in Terrebonne Parish, Louisiana, United States. It is privately owned by Charlie Hammonds and managed by Carol Hammonds.

Facilities and aircraft 
It has one seaplane landing area (1W/19W) measuring 6,000 by 150 ft (1,829 by 46 m) which is located on the Intracoastal Waterway. For the 12-month period ending November 15, 2006, the airport had 7,400 general aviation aircraft operations, an average of 20 per day.

References

External links 
Hammonds Air Service

Defunct airports in Louisiana
Airports in Louisiana
Seaplane bases in the United States